Anisochirus madagascariensis is a species of ground beetle in the subfamily Harpalinae. It was described by Dejean in 1831.

References

Beetles described in 1831
Harpalinae